Cryptolechia falsitorophanes is a moth in the family Depressariidae. It was described by Wang in 2006. It is found in Hubei, China.

The length of the forewings is 11.5–12 mm. The forewings are greyish brown to dark brown, with scattered brown scales. There is an inverted yellowish triangular spot at the distal one-sixth, a broad yellowish fascia from the costal half extending beyond the middle of the dorsum, with two black dots on both sides. The termen is whitish yellow. The hindwings are pale brown.

Etymology
The species name refers to the similarity with Cryptolechia torophanes and is derived from Latin falsus (meaning false).

References

Moths described in 2006
Cryptolechia (moth)